Gymnopternus cupreus  is a species of fly in the family Dolichopodidae. It is found in the  Palearctic.

References

External links
Images representing Gymnopternus at BOLD

Dolichopodinae
Insects described in 1823
Asilomorph flies of Europe
Taxa named by Carl Fredrik Fallén